Błażej Wyszkowski (born 3 February 1949) is a Polish sailor. He competed in the Finn event at the 1972 Summer Olympics.

References

External links
 

1949 births
Living people
Polish male sailors (sport)
Olympic sailors of Poland
Sailors at the 1972 Summer Olympics – Finn
Sportspeople from Olsztyn